Isaac Fruechte (born March 7, 1991) is an American football wide receiver who is currently a free agent. Fruechte played college football at Rochester Community and Technical College and Minnesota as well as high school in-state at Caledonia.

Early years
Fruechte is a graduate of Caledonia High School in Caledonia, Minnesota. Under the guidance of his father Carl, who is a legendary football and basketball coach at Caledonia, Isaac played as a wide receiver and safety and helped lead the Warriors to two consecutive state championships (2007, 2008), three section championships and two 3 Rivers Conference titles. He was a two-time Associated Press Honorable Mention All-State selection and a three-time All-3 Rivers conference selection. Following his senior season, he was named to the St. Paul Pioneer Press All-State team. In addition to football, Fruechte was also a standout track and field athlete at Caledonia, earning four straight berths at the state championships. He had a personal-best time of 10.82 seconds in the 100-meter dash and was timed under 4.4 seconds in the 40-yard dash.

College career

RCTC
Fruechte had been asked to walk on at the University of Minnesota out of high school, but due to Minnesota's strict admission standards, Isaac's math score in high school wasn't good enough, therefore he opted to enroll at Rochester Community and Technical College in the fall of 2010 instead. Listed at 6-foot-3, 200-pound, Fruechte played his freshman season in 2010 with the Yellowjackets, catching 30 passes for 805 yards and nine touchdowns, helping the team finish with a 10-2 record, beating Central Lakes 34-31 in the state championship game before falling to Iowa Central 32-7 in the North Star Bowl. For his efforts, he was named second-team All-Minnesota College Athletic Conference. After graduating from Rochester in December, Fruechte enrolled at Minnesota for the spring semester.

Minnesota
In his first season with the Gophers, Isaac started 9 out of 12 games. He recorded 19 receptions for 256 yards and 2 touchdowns for the run-heavy Minnesota offense. The Gophers improved their record to 6-7 and went to the Texas Bowl, their first bowl game in years. Fruechte was named Minnesota's Wide Receiver of the Year at the Gophers annual football banquet.

As a sophomore in 2013, Fruechte started 6 out of 13 games. He recorded 13 receptions for 154 yards in a year where the passing game struggled and the running game flourished. The Gophers improved their record to 8-5, and went back to the Texas Bowl for the second year in a row. 

During his senior year, Fruechte played in all 13 games and set career-highs in receptions with 18 and receiving yards with 292 yards. As the year went on, his role on the team expanded. He had 3 receptions for 46 yards against Northwestern in Week 6, and a 45-yard catch against Purdue the following week. On October 25 against Illinois, he had a career-game with 3 receptions for 105 yards, including his lone touchdown of the season on a 52-yard pass from quarterback Mitch Leidner. The Gophers went 8-5 again, beating Michigan, Iowa, and Nebraska, to earn a New Years Day bowl game in the Citrus Bowl.

Statistics

Professional career

Minnesota Vikings
Fruechte was signed by the Minnesota Vikings after going undrafted in the 2015 NFL Draft. On September 3, 2016, he was released by the Vikings as part of final roster cuts.

Detroit Lions
On September 5, 2016, Fruechte was signed to the Detroit Lions practice squad. He was released by the team on September 21, 2016.

Minnesota Vikings (second stint)
On September 27, 2016, Fruechte was signed to the Vikings' practice squad. With the Vikings set to take on the Chicago Bears for their last game of the regular season, the Vikings promoted Fruechte to the active roster on December 31 due to injury issues at the wide receiver position.

On September 2, 2017, Fruechte was waived by the Vikings.

References

External links
Minnesota Vikings bio
Minnesota Golden Gophers bio

Living people
1991 births
American football wide receivers
Minnesota Golden Gophers football players
Minnesota Vikings players
Detroit Lions players
Rochester Yellowjackets (NJCAA) football players
People from Caledonia, Minnesota